Beef or Chicken is the first studio album by Teriyaki Boyz. It was released on November 16, 2005. It peaked at number 4 on the Oricon Albums Chart.

Track listing

Charts

References

External links
 

2005 debut albums
Def Jam Recordings albums
Albums produced by Mark Ronson
Albums produced by Thomas Bangalter
Albums produced by Guy-Manuel de Homem-Christo
Albums produced by Dan the Automator
Albums produced by the Neptunes
Albums produced by Just Blaze
Albums produced by DJ Premier
Albums produced by DJ Shadow